Statistics of UAE Football League for the 1974–75 season.

Overview
It was contested by 6 teams, and Al Ahli won the championship.

League standings

References
United Arab Emirates - List of final tables (RSSSF)

UAE Pro League seasons
1
Emir